Tolkin may refer to:

 Mel Tolkin, né Shmuel Tolchinsky (1913 - 2007), a Russo-Canadian television comedy writer
 Michael Tolkin (born 1950), an American filmmaker and novelist; son of Mel Tolkin
 Mike Tolkin (born 1967), American rugby coach
 Neil Tolkin, a Canadian-American screen writer
 Peter Tolkin Architecture (formerly Tolkin & Associates Architecture), an architectural firm based in Pasadena, California
 Terry Tolkin, the Vice President of A&R at Elektra Records

See also 
 Tolkien (disambiguation) (Low German surname)
 Toelken

Jewish families